Christopher Nelson is a retired Indian Police Service Officer and comes from Nagercoil in the Indian state of Tamil Nadu.

A postgraduate who studied economics, Nelson retired from policing in 2011 and was appointed as a full-time member of the Tamil Nadu Planning Commission. He had held the rank of Inspector-general in the police.

He has denied allegations that he was present at the controversial arrest of M. K. Karunanidhi, the then chief minister of Tamil Nadu, in 2001.

Achievements
He was awarded the President's Police Medal in 1995. In September 2012 he was appointed an Information Commissioner for Tamil Nadu by the state's government.

References

Living people
People from Kanyakumari district
Indian Police Service officers
Year of birth missing (living people)
People from Nagercoil